Eleanor McEvoy (born 22 January 1967) is an Irish singer-songwriter. She composed the song "Only a Woman's Heart", title track of A Woman's Heart, the best-selling Irish album in Irish history.

Early life and beginnings 
McEvoy's life as a musician began at the age of four when she began playing piano. At the age of eight she took up violin. Upon finishing school she attended Trinity College Dublin where she studied music by day and worked in pit orchestras and music clubs by night. McEvoy graduated from Trinity with an Honors Degree in music in 1988, and spent four months busking in New York City. In 1988, she was accepted into the RTÉ National Symphony Orchestra where she spent four years before leaving to concentrate on songwriting.

Career

1992–2000
McEvoy built up a following in clubs in Dublin with her three piece band, Jim Tate on bass, Noel Eccles on drums, and latterly Bill Shanley on guitar. During a solo date in July 1992, she performed a little-known, self-penned song, "Only a Woman's Heart". Mary Black, of whose band McEvoy was a member, was in the audience and invited her to add the track to an album of Irish female artists. The album was subsequently titled A Woman's Heart and the track was released as the lead single.

A few days before A Woman's Heart was released, Tom Zutaut A&R from Geffen Records, who had previously signed Guns N' Roses, Mötley Crüe, and Edie Brickell, offered McEvoy a worldwide recording deal after watching her perform at The Baggot Inn in Dublin.

The album went on to sell over three-quarters of a million copies in Ireland alone and was (and remains) the biggest selling Irish album of all time.

Eleanor McEvoy, her first album, recorded in Windmill Lane Studios, was released in February 1993, and tours in the United States, Asia, and Europe followed. Back on Irish soil, McEvoy was awarded Best New Artist, Best New Performer, and Best Songwriter Awards by the Irish entertainment and music industries. In 2011, Portuguese singer Luis Represas included a version of Go Now from McEvoy's eponymous album on his recording Reserva Especial.

As she began writing her second album, Tom Zutaut left Geffen Records, and McEvoy was offered and accepted a new deal with Columbia Records US. The new album, What's Following Me?, was released in 1996. The single "Precious Little" became a top-10 radio hit in the United States, giving McEvoy the exposure she needed for a headline tour of the US. She was invited to contribute to a number of movie and TV soundtracks.

At home, the success of A Woman's Heart continued to overshadow McEvoy's solo work and fans of the mammoth hit were disappointed with the rock elements of the second album and those that might have identified with her bittersweet lyrics, sensual vocals, and loud guitars turned a blind eye to the album.

McEvoy released her third album, Snapshots, in 1999. Her primary goal was to make Snapshots her most song-oriented album to date. Toward that goal, McEvoy teamed up with producer Rupert Hine (who worked with Stevie Nicks, Tina Turner, Suzanne Vega, and Duncan Sheik) and recorded the album at Rupert's "Chateau de la Tour de Moulin" and then in Metropolis Studios in London. The extensive use of drum loops was a complete change in style from her previous work.

The album was greeted by rave reviews on both sides of the Atlantic. "... her sophisticated voice and compassionate seasoned lyrics ... make Eleanor McEvoy's album a gem...." declared The Boston Globe, while The Sunday Times described it as "her strongest album to date, with well appointed social comment topics...McEvoy's take on matters emotional also hits pay dirt with the likes of the excellent 'Did You Tell Him?'" However, Columbia Records had been unprepared for the complete stylistic change and relations between the company and McEvoy became strained. Despite this, a sell-out, 24-date tour of the United States accompanied the release of Snapshots in the summer of 1999, followed by the "Snapshots Unplugged" tour March–April 2000, which culminated in a performance in Boulder, Colorado accompanied by the E Town Band where she duetted with Richard Thompson.

Columbia Records had bought her first album Eleanor McEvoy from Geffen Records, but had not released it by 2000. Neither What's Following Me? nor Snapshots had enjoyed major chart success, and McEvoy's public perception, particularly in Ireland, was caught in a limbo state between rock and folk, with "A Woman's Heart" and its many incarnations still lurking in the back of the minds of the record-buying public.

Increasingly, McEvoy started to work on outside projects. The Bert Jansch tribute album People on the Highway – A Bert Jansch Encomium (2000) saw a newly recorded version of Jansch's song about Sandy Denny, "Where Did My Life Go?", recorded by McEvoy especially for the album. Participating artists included Al Stewart, Roy Harper, Bernard Butler, Donovan, and Ralph McTell.

2001–2005

McEvoy decided to take her fourth album and head down the independent road. Yola was a turning point in McEvoy's musical direction. Released in 2001, it reflected the acoustic, jazz-influenced style she had developed on stage with Brian Connor. For McEvoy it was a new departure and one that found favour with music media. Irish Music Press described it as .... "her finest album", "a brave rejection of the predictable", "musically daring....beautifully atmospheric". International press lauded it as "a back to basics triumph", "beautifully restrained", "a classic", and "McEvoy's best release to date". Extensive touring throughout the US and the UK followed. In 2002, Yola was named "Record of the Year" by Hi-Fi+ Magazine.

March 2004 saw the release of Early Hours, produced by McEvoy and Brian Connor. The album featured McEvoy on vocals, guitar, and fiddle; Connor on piano, Fender Rhodes, Wurlitzer, Hammond organ, and keyboards; Liam Bradley on kit percussion and backing vocals; Calum McColl on guitars and backing vocals; Nicky Scott on bass; and Lindley Hamilton on trumpets. The style differed from McEvoy's previous work, taking on a jazz/blues feel for many of the songs. Early Hours continued the high-quality audio work that had been established with Yola. This album was the first to use TiMax (unique audio imaging) technology, mixed in 5.1 surround-sound onto multi-channel Super Audio CD (SACD). Early Hours was voted Best Contemporary Album 2004–2005, by Irish Music Magazine Readers Poll.

McEvoy continued to tour with Brian Connor until April 2005. She then began performing solo, accompanying herself on bass guitar, electric guitar, mandolin and violin.

2007–2010

McEvoy's sixth album, Out There, was recorded in The Grange Studio in Norfolk and released in early 2007. It was self-penned, self-produced and featured McEvoy performing all of the instruments with the exception of a guitar part on "Quote I Love You Unquote" played by Dave Rotheray (formerly of Beautiful South) and the drumming of Liam Bradley (Van Morrison, Ronan Keating) on three tracks. On track 5, Vigeland's Dream, McEvoy eloquently describes a walk she once took in Vigeland Sculpture Park which is a part of Frogner Park (Frognerparken), a public park located in the borough of Frogner, in Oslo, Norway. McEvoy toured the album extensively in Britain, Ireland, Spain and Australia throughout 2007 and early 2008. In 2007, Out There brought McEvoy her second "Record of the Year" award from Hi-Fi+ Magazine.

Love Must Be Tough (MOSCD404, released 2008), her seventh album, is a departure from previous albums, where all the songs were typically her own. Half of the album features covers of songs originally written and performed by men about women.

The lead single, "Old, New, Borrowed and Blue", written by McEvoy and long-time friend Dave Rotheray (Beautiful South/Homespun), is a twist on the jaundiced over-optimism of the standard wedding song. Another track by the duo, "The Night May Still Be Young, But I Am Not", is also on the album. In 2008, McEvoy received her third "Record of the Year" award from Hi-Fi+ Magazine.

In 2007, McEvoy was awarded "Best Traditional Act" at the 7th annual Big Buzz Awards, which are voted for entirely by the general public.

In 2008, McEvoy toured from January to November in the UK, Australia, Spain, Germany, Poland and Ireland, with additional one-off dates in the Far East and elsewhere in Europe, including an appearance at Glastonbury in June 2008.

On 21 November 2008, "Easy in Love" from the album Love Must Be Tough was released as a single to highlight McEvoy's visit to Uganda on behalf of Oxfam Ireland.

McEvoy's album Singled Out was released on 28 September 2008. The album is a compilation of singles taken from McEvoy's four award-winning, independently released albums. Three of the albums, Yola, Out There, and Love Must Be Tough, received the Album of the Year Award from Hi-Fi+ Magazine.
Early Hours was voted Best Contemporary Album 2004–2005 by Irish Music Magazine Readers Poll. The album includes "Did I Hurt You" and "Isn't It a Little Late" from McEvoy's double A-side single, the world's first single to be released on SACD format.
Singled Out includes one new song, "Oh Uganda", which was written by McEvoy after her visit to Northern Uganda as part of her support for the work of Oxfam Unwrapped.

I'd Rather Go Blonde, released 20 September 2010, is McEvoy's eighth album, and was met with good reviews including the five-star review in 2010 Maverick Magazine: "This absolutely stunning album, has been a real find – one of the most compelling female singer-songwriters I've heard in a long time."

2011–2014

Alone, McEvoy's ninth album, released 12 September 2011, is a collection of twelve stripped-down solo numbers. Says McEvoy, ""There was a time when I was stranded in a long gap between tour dates and, with time to kill, I headed for the peace of The Grange; a small studio tucked away in the Norfolk countryside." The product of those tranquil sessions is an album of incredibly haunting performances, up close, personal, and timeless. This is McEvoy in her most intimate setting, running through the journey of her writing and singing career.

If You Leave... McEvoy's tenth studio album was released 6 May 2013. It features eight new songs and four interpretations including "God Only Knows", "True Colors", and "Lift The Wings" from Riverdance. Said McEvoy, "I'd been listening to a lot of 60s albums, Stones, Beatles, Beach Boys stuff like that and it was with the spirit of those albums in my musical soul that I entered the studio."

"STUFF" McEvoy's eleventh studio album, was released on 21 March 2014. The tracks on the album were compiled to meet the requests from fans for songs they couldn't find elsewhere. McEvoy chose the songs from her collection of single mixes, audiophile tracks, and songs written and performed on other artists records. McEvoy then went into the studio to record tracks that weren't found in her collection. After all songs were recorded the entire album was re-mastered.

2015–present

Naked Music is McEvoy's twelfth studio album, recorded at the Grange Studio in Norfolk, UK. McEvoy recorded the tracks by "studio-performing", in other words, playing the songs as she would in a live performance. The album's concept was partially inspired by a painting entitled 'Champagne Sheila' by Chris Gollon, and the cover artwork features four of his paintings. In January 2016 in association with IAP Fine Art, the album was launched in London, in an exhibition of Gollon's paintings inspired by the album's songs. Later the same year NAKED MUSIC: The Songbook was published by Hot Press, documenting the association and collaboration, the songs and the paintings they inspired, with text and interviews by Jackie Hayden. One of the songs on the album, Eleanor McEvoy co-wrote with Lloyd Cole entitled 'Dreaming of Leaving', which then inspired a painting by Chris Gollon 'Dreaming of Leaving (I)', which was featured inside the album cover. This painting in turn inspired McEvoy to write the song 'Gimme Some Wine', which she wrote for and dedicated to Chris Gollon. This unusual and ongoing experiment in artistic 'boundary crossing' proved very fruitful, as songs inspired paintings, which in turn inspired songs that inspired paintings. Chris Gollon responded to the song 'Gimme Some Wine' by painting 23 works, some on paper, some on canvas, and they were his last great series of paintings before his untimely death in April 2017. They were first exhibited at IAP Fine Art in Monmouth in the 'Gimme Some Wine' exhibition, with Eleanor McEvoy performing the song that inspired them at the private view.

In 2017 McEvoy was appointed Chairperson of the Irish Music Rights Organisation (IMRO).'

In January 2019, McEvoy appeared as a contestant on RTÉ's Celebrity Home of the Year.

In 2019, the two-year collaboration with Chris Gollon featured in the three-month major museum retrospective at Huddersfield Art Gallery, showing Gollon's music-related works and including the canvas 'Gimme Some Wine – Final Version', for which Eleanor McEvoy made a special recording of the song 'Gimme Some Wine'.

"Only a Woman's Heart" 
"Only a Woman's Heart" written by McEvoy is the title song of the album A Woman's Heart which went on to sell over three-quarters of a million copies in Ireland alone and was (and remains) the biggest selling Irish album of all time.

The song "Only A Woman's Heart" has been covered by a number of artists including:
Emmylou Harris with Mary Black on Black's 1996 album Wonder Child
Phil Coulter on his 2005 album Recollections
French Canadian singer Isabelle Boulay. Boulay's version appeared on her album De retour à la source, which was nominated as one of the five finalists for the 2008 Juno Awards for the category "Francophone Album of The Year".
Les mejores canciones dance del Siglo XX – Vol. 11, 2011
Celtic Woman 2012 album Celtic Woman: Believe

"Only A Woman's Heart" also has a page and half mention in Charles Webb's book New Cardiff, which was made into the movie Hope Springs. Webb's book, The Graduate, was the basis for the award-winning film The Graduate.

2012 marks the twentieth anniversary of A Woman's Heart. The anniversary was celebrated with four sold-out performances at the Olympia Theatre in Dublin, Ireland. Eleanor McEvoy, Mary Coughlan, Sharon Shannon, Dolores Keane, Wallis Bird, and Hermione Hennessy were on the bill. Further anniversary concerts are being planned.

In April 2012, Kiera Murphy produced at documentary entitled Our Woman's Hearts which explores how A Woman's Heart came about, why it became so popular, as well as the effect it has had on three generations of women. The documentary is a part of RTÉ Radio 1's series Documentary on One.

The Secret of Living , written by McEvoy, was released in July 2012 to celebrate the 20th Anniversary of the iconic A Woman's Heart. The song is performed by McEvoy, Mary Coughlan, Sharon Shannon, Gemma Hayes, and Hermione Hennessey. In a review from Hot Press, The Secret of Living was described as a classy new single from the A Woman's Heart group.

Discography 
 Eleanor McEvoy – Geffen Records (GEFC/GEFD24606) 1993 Produced by Pat Moran. No longer available replaced by Special Edition (see above)
 What's Following Me? – Columbia Records (484233.2) 1996 Produced by Eleanor McEvoy and Kevin Moloney
 Snapshots – Columbia Records (CK494598.2) 1999 Produced by Rupert Hine
 Yola – Mosco (EMSACD1) 2001 Produced by Eleanor McEvoy and Brian Connor.
 Eleanor McEvoy 'Special Edition' – Market Square (MSMCD127) 2003 {Remastered Geffen album with 4 extra tracks} Produced by Pat Moran.
 Early Hours – Moscodisc / Market Square (MSM1SACD128) 2004 Produced by Brian Connor & Eleanor McEvoy
 Out There – Moscodisc (MOSACD 303) September 2006 Produced by Mick O'Gorman and Eleanor McEvoy
 Love Must Be Tough – Moscodisc (MOSCD404) February 2008 Produced by Peter Beckett and Mick O'Gorman
 Singled Out – Moscodisc (MOSCD406) September 2009 Various Producers
 I'd Rather Go Blonde – Moscodisc (MOSCD408) September 2010 Produced by Mick O'Gorman, Eleanor McEvoy, and Peter Beckett; recorded by Ciaran Byrne; mixed by Ruadhri Cushnan; mastered by Ian Cooper.
 Alone – Moscodisc (MOSCD409) September 2011 Produced by Mick O'Gorman, Eleanor McEvoy, recorded by Dave Williams and Ciaran Byrne; mixed by Ciaran Byrne and Mick O'Gorman; mastered by Ian Cooper.
 If You Leave... – Moscodisc (MOSCOD4010) March 2013 Produced by Eleanor McEvoy and Mick O'Gorman; mixed by Ciaran Byrne and Mick O'Gorman; mastered by Ian Cooper at Metropolis Studios; front cover by Tim Staffell.
Stuff – Moscodisc (MOSCD4111) March 2014 Produced by Mick O'Gorman, Eleanor McEvoy and Peter Beckett; mixed by Ciaran Byrne; mastered by Ian Cooper at Metropolis Studios except track 11 mastered by Ray Staff
Naked Music – Moscodisc (MOSCD4014) February 2016 Produced by Mick O'Gorman; mixed by Ciaran Byrne; engineered by Dave Williams; mastered by Tony Cousins at Metropolis Studios, London
The Thomas Moore Project – Moscodisc (MOSCD4015) June 2017 Produced by Eleanor McEvoy Recorded and mixed by Ciaran Byrne; mastered by Tony Cousins at Metropolis Studios, London
Gimme Some Wine - Moscodisc October 2021

Music in film and TV

Feature and independent films 
 McEvoy sang Bill Whelan's song "The Seabird" in Some Mother's Son starring Helen Mirren, director Terry George written by Jim Sheridan and Terry George.
 The song "I Hear You Breathing In" features in How To Cheat in the Leaving Certificate starring Mick Lally and Mary McEvoy.
 The song "Whisper a Prayer to the Moon" features in The Nephew starring Pierce Brosnan, Donal McCann, Sinéad Cusack, and Niall Tobin.
 The song "I Hear You Breathing In" features in El vuelo del tren "The Magic of Hope" which was selected by the European Film Promotion in 2012 and nominated to four ASECAN Awards in 2012 and by the Galway Film Fleadh. (director Paco Torres, 2009).

Television 
  The HBO series Six Feet Under featured the song "All I Have", written by Caroline Lavelle and McEvoy.
 "A Glass Unkissed" from the 1996 album What's Following Me? appeared in television network ABC's popular series Clueless.
 American Network PBS's documentary In Our Own Voice features "Easy To Lose Hope" from McEvoy's 1999 album Snapshots. The song, produced by Rupert Hine, is about murdered journalist Veronica Guerin.
 "All I Have" from the 1999 album Snapshots was featured on ABC's One Life to Live, a long-running daytime-TV soap opera.
 McEvoy's song "Only A Woman's Heart" appeared in Irish Network RTÉ's popular soap Glenroe.
 "Days Roll By" from Early Hours (Moscodisc 2004) appears in Fair City, a popular soap about daily life in a Dublin city.

Super Audio and vinyl 
McEvoy's fourth album Yola drew favourable attention from the Hi-Fi press and market as one of the first original titles recorded specifically for SACD. With the collaboration of sound designer Mick O'Gorman, the world's first-ever SACD single "Did I Hurt You" (Market Square MSMSACD114) was released from the same album. To this day Yola is regarded as a Hi-Fi industry standard and is used by high-end audio companies to test speakers.

Releasing on compact disc, SACD, and vinyl, McEvoy's albums have won many audio awards. Early Hours was the first to use TiMax (unique audio imaging) technology, mixed in 5.1 surround-sound onto multi-channel SACD. McEvoy's album Love Must Be Tough was named Album of the Year by Hi-Fi Plus, the prestigious UK publication, and was released on vinyl in August 2008 by Diverse Vinyl in the UK.

Books

Naked Music-The Songbook 
Naked Music-The Songbook is the first songbook to be published by McEvoy. The publication is a pioneering collaboration between McEvoy and artist Chris Gollon. It includes lyrics and melodies from the songs on McEvoy's 2016 album Naked Music, alongside 24 of Gollon's stunning paintings inspired by the music on the album. Foreword and interviews by Jackie Hayden.

Other projects 
 OXFAM

In October 2008, at the invitation of Oxfam Ireland, McEvoy visited Uganda. Travelling throughout the Kitgum region of Northern Uganda, she experienced first hand the benefits of Oxfam Ireland Unwrapped, an initiative that sends meaningful presents like clean drinking water, school books and vegetable gardens to developing countries throughout Africa. This visit provided the inspiration for a new song "Oh Uganda".

 Midge Ure

Midge Ure's top-twenty album Breathe featured McEvoy on three tracks, "Fallen Angel", "Fields of Fire" and "Lay My Body Down". McEvoy contributed the Gaelic lyrics on "Fallen Angel". The album was produced by Richard Feldman.

 RTÉ Concert Orchestra

In 2005, the RTÉ Concert Orchestra commissioned arrangements for 16 of McEvoy's compositions to be performed at a concert in August 2005 at the National Concert Hall in Dublin. The 60-piece orchestra was conducted by David Brophy and featured, in addition McEvoy herself, other leading Irish arrangers, Johnny Tate, David Brophy, Brian Byrne, and Fergus O'Carroll.

The sell-out performance formed part of the annual BEO Festival, hosted by the National Concert Hall and sponsored by the ESB.

The songs, with their new arrangements, were drawn from McEvoy's first five albums, incorporating music from Yola and Early Hours, along with many others, including "Whisper a Prayer to the Moon" (from Pierce Brosnan's The Nephew), "Famine" (from The Gathering the Commemoration of the Irish Famine), and of course her contribution to the canon of Irish music standards, "Only a Woman's Heart".

 Homespun and Dave Rotheray

In January 2006, McEvoy supported the band Homespun on a British tour in support of their second album, Effortless Cool. During this tour she also began writing with Dave Rotheray.

Three Rotheray/McEvoy compositions appear on McEvoy's albums: "Quote I Love You Unquote" on Out There and "The Night May Still Be Young But I Am Not" and "Old New Borrowed and Blue" on 2008 album Love Must Be Tough.

Homespun's third album, Short Stories From East Yorkshire, features two Rotheray/McEvoy compositions which are also produced by Dave Rotheray and Eleanor McEvoy; "Lover's Chapel" and "The Driver". "The Driver" was sung by well-known Irish singer Mary Coughlan.

In 2017, Eleanor McEvoy joined with Dave Rotheray's new project Prosecco Socialist, together with Mike Greaves. They released a Christmas single "This Dog's Just For Christmas (Not For Life)" and an album "Songs From Life Behind Bars" was released on 27 April 2018.

 The Brewster Brothers

John and Rick Brewster are founding members and major songwriters of the legendary Angels, one of Australia's most successful rock bands. After three decades, The Angels remain one of Australia's most loved and respected bands. A few years ago Rick and John started a new breakaway project, performing acoustically as The Brewster Brothers.

Performing at the Port Fairy Folk Festival in Australia 2007, the band were joined on stage by Anne Kirkpatrick and McEvoy (violin) for standout spontaneous renditions of several of their songs. The concert was recorded by the ABC Australia. The show was broadcast on ABC Radio National on 18 May and then again on Sunday 20 May. Due to demand from ABC Australia listeners, Brewster Brothers in Concert Live at the Port Fairy Folk Festival was released shortly afterwards.

 Paul Brady at Vicar Street

In October 2001, Paul Brady took over Vicar Street (one of the most popular music venues in Dublin) for twenty three nights to revisit his entire career. It was a bold move and a great success. Over the course of the month more than 16,000 people saw the shows.

As well as a chance to revisit past material Paul availed of the opportunity to invite many of the artists he has worked or written with over the last thirty years to come and play. Among them were Bonnie Raitt, Mark Knopfler, Van Morrison, Sinéad O'Connor, Curtis Stigers, Maura O'Connell, Mary Black, Ronan Keating, Brian Kennedy, Gavin Friday, Tim O'Brien, Arty McGlynn, The Hothouse Flowers. and many more.

McEvoy joined him for Thursday 12 October. Highlights of the night were Paul and McEvoy singing a duet on "You and I" an antiracism song of Paul's and Paul's rendition of McEvoy's song "Last Seen 9 October".

 The Great Irish Famine Event – The National Concert Hall'

McEvoy was commissioned by the Irish Government to write a piece about The Irish Famine for a concert held in the National Concert Hall in Dublin in 1997. The song was "Famine 1848". It is an orchestral piece with vocal part sung by McEvoy.

The event entitled "The Great Irish Famine Event" was held to commemorate the Great Famine of 1845–1852.

The song Famine also features on a limited edition version of the album What's Following Me? (Columbia Records).

 "Eleanor McEvoy Presents", Wexford Arts Centre

"ELEANOR McEVOY PRESENTS" was a project which was instigated for the reopening of the Wexford Arts Centre in October 2006.

For four weeks during the Wexford Festival Opera McEvoy featured some of her favourite performers of contemporary music.

The first show on Friday 27 October featured McEvoy herself. During the show she played a traditional set along with some local Wexford musicians: well-known Wexford Uilleann Piper Brendan Wickham, Pat Gough on accordion, and Niall Lacey on Bazouki.

The shows on the following Fridays featured various different artists much admired by her over the years. These included Andy Irvine, Luka Bloom, Caroline Moreau, and Oleg Ponomarev.

The Wexford Arts Centre places an emphasis on contemporary and emerging Irish and international art and a range of plays, concerts, film and lectures. The centre is also resident in a preserved heritage site, built in 1760s, as a market place and assembly halls.

 The Ballad of Ronnie Drew (2008)

"The Ballad of Ronnie Drew" was a song written by Bono, Edge, (U2) Simon Carmody and Robert Hunter (Grateful Dead). It was initially written to include Ronnie Drew, but as his health declined it was altered to be sung by the Irish music fraternity in his honour.

It was performed by a number of famous Irish musicians. With popular Irish band Kila as the backing band, other contributors included members of U2, The Dubliners, Christy Moore, Chris de Burgh, Sinéad O'Connor, The Chieftains, Mundy, Andrea Corr, Moya Brennan, Paul Brady, Christy Dignam, Duke Special, Ronan Keating, Gavin Friday, Bob Geldof, Glen Hansard, McEvoy, and Shane MacGowan.

The single was released on 19 February 2008 and entered the Irish Single Charts at #2. At the request of Ronnie, all proceeds went to the Irish Cancer Society.

Award-winning director John Carney (director of the film Once) directed the video for "The Ballad of Ronnie Drew". It was filmed over two days at Dublin's Windmill Lane Studios in January 2008.

 Tuesday's Child

Tuesday's Child was spearheaded by Belfast woman Orla Sheehan. It consisted of a CD featuring tracks from a total of 31 performers including Snow Patrol, Westlife, Ronan Keating, Duke Special, and McEvoy. Each artist donated a track for the Tuesday's Child self-titled double album which was first launched in Belfast on 8 November 2007 and in Dublin on 7 March 2008.

Proceeds of the album went towards helping children in need in 12 countries including: Bolivia, Bosnia and Herzegovina, Brazil, Democratic Republic of the Congo, Egypt, Ghana, Grenada, Israel, Moldova, Palestine, and Zimbabwe.

 IMRO

McEvoy is Chairperson of IMRO Irish Music Rights Organisation. IMRO is a national organisation that administers the performing right in copyright music in Ireland on behalf of its members – songwriters, composers and music publishers – and on behalf of the members of the international overseas societies that are affiliated to it. IMRO's function is to collect and distribute royalties arising from the public performance of copyright works. IMRO is a not-for-profit organisation.

 Banana Boat featuring Eleanor McEvoy

McEvoy and renowned Polish a cappella group Banana Boat collaborated to re-record McEvoy's song "Little Look" from her album Out There. A music video was also made of the song. The debut went straight to the play list of famed Lista Przebojów Programu Trzeciego (Polskie Radio Three). The video went on to be named Video of the Week by the Contemporary A Cappella Society (of America). In 2009, the recording was awarded "Collaboration of the Year with an Artist from Outside Poland" in the 2009 Polish Friends of Music Awards.

Portrait by Robert Ballagh
On 20 January 2012, a portrait of McEvoy painted by Robert Ballagh was hung in the National Concert Hall Dublin, Ireland

 Riverdance The Music of Bill Whelan

On 17 May 2012, McEvoy was the guest vocalist at the performance of Riverdance: The Music of Bill Whelan at the National Concert Hall Dublin, Ireland. The performance featured the world premier of the Riverdance Symphonic Suite.

National Concert Hall, Dublin
In June 2016, the Minister for Arts, Heritage and the Gaeltacht, Heather Humphreys, announced the appointment of McEvoy to the Board of the National Concert Hall.

References

External links 
Eleanor McEvoy official website

1967 births
Alumni of Trinity College Dublin
Living people
Irish women singers
Irish folk singers
Irish women singer-songwriters
Musicians from Dublin (city)
Eleanor McEvoy albums
People from Cabra, Dublin